Carlos Parra (born February 3, 1977) is a retired American soccer player who was the first player signed by MLS Pro 40. He played professionally as a defender in Major League Soccer and the USL First Division.

Professional career

Club
Parra played for the Oakwood Soccer Club in Glastonbury, CT. In 1997, Parra graduated from Hamden Hall Country Day School where he was a two-time Parade Magazine All American soccer player.  On March 1, 1997, Parra became the first player to sign with MLS Project 40.  The league assigned him to the MetroStars.  He began the 1998 season on loan to MLS Pro 40 in the USISL A-League. On June 5, 1998, the MetroStars traded Parra to the Miami Fusion for Ramiro Corrales. On June 4, 1999 the Fusion sent Parra to the New England Revolution for Tony Kuhn and a second-round pick in the 2000 MLS SuperDraft. The Revolution sent him on loan to MLS Pro 40 and the Connecticut Wolves during the 2000 season.  On March 20, 2001, the Revolution traded Parra and Imad Baba to the Colorado Rapids for Matt Okoh and the Rapids second round draft pick in the 2002 MLS SuperDraft.  On March 26, the Rapids waived Parra.  Parra then signed with the Rochester Rhinos of the USL A-League.  On June 11, 2001, Parra moved to the Atlanta Silverbacks as part of a three-team trade.  As part of the trade deal, the Silverbacks sent Steve Armas to the Minnesota Thunder and the Thunder sent Stoian Mladenov to the Rhinos.  On February 10, 2003, Parra signed with the Minnesota Thunder.  He played two games, then retired.

International
In 1997, Parra played two games for the United States men's national under-20 soccer team at the 1997 FIFA World Youth Championship.  From 1998 to 2000, he also played nine times for the United States men's national under-23 soccer team.

External links

References

Living people
1977 births
American sportspeople of Colombian descent
American soccer players
Atlanta Silverbacks players
Connecticut Wolves players
New York Red Bulls players
Miami Fusion players
New England Revolution players
Minnesota Thunder players
Rochester New York FC players
Major League Soccer players
A-League (1995–2004) players
United States men's under-20 international soccer players
United States men's under-23 international soccer players
MLS Pro-40 players
Association football defenders
Hamden Hall Country Day School alumni